David Martin  (22 December 1915 – 1 July 1997), born Lajos or Ludwig Detsinyi, into a Jewish family in Hungary (then part of Austria-Hungary), was an Australian novelist, poet, playwright, journalist, editor, literary reviewer and lecturer. He also used the names Louis Adam and Louis Destiny, adopting the name David Martin after moving to England.

Biography
Martin was born in Budapest, but educated in Germany. He left Germany in 1934, spending time in the Netherlands, Hungary and Palestine. In 1937 he travelled to Spain. where he served as a volunteer in the medical service of the International Brigade of the Spanish Republican Army during the Spanish Civil War.

In 1938 Martin joined his father in London, working in his clothing factory, before moving to Glasgow in 1941 where he worked as a correspondent with the Daily Express. In 1941, Martin married Elizabeth Richenda Powell, great-granddaughter of the Quaker Elizabeth Fry. They had one son, Jan. Martin returned to London, working for the BBC until 1944. From 1945 to 1947 he was literary editor of Reynold's News. In 1948 he travelled to India as British correspondent for the Daily Express.

Martin and his family settled in Australia from 1950, settling in Melbourne, where Martin commenced work as a freelance journalist and editor of the Australian Jewish News. He joined the Communist Party in 1951, was active until 1956 and remained a member until 1959, when he was asked to resign. He had weekly current affairs columns in Free Press (1951–52) and the Sunday Observer (1969–71) and was foreign correspondent for the Indian newspaper Hindu and for the Canadian newspaper the Montreal Star. In addition, he contributed an enormous number of articles, short stories and reviews to a variety of newspapers and journals, including Overland, Meanjin, Southerly and Quadrant, covering a diverse range of topics.

In 1988, Martin was made a Member of the Order of Australia for his services to Australian literature. He also won the Patrick White Award in 1991 and was given an Emeritus Award by the Literature Fund of the Australia Council in 1996. David Martin died in Beechworth, Victoria, on 1 July 1997.

One of his grandchildren, Toby Martin, is the guitarist and frontman of the rock band Youth Group.

Bibliography

 
Tiger Bay (1946)
The Shoes Men Walk In (1946)
The Shepherd and the Hunter (1946)
Birth of a Miner (1949)
The Stones of Bombay (1950)
From Life (1953)
Rob the Robber (1954)
Poems of David Martin 1938-58 (1958)
Spiegel the Cat (1961)
The Young Wife (1962)
Eight by Eight (1963)
The Hero of Too (1965)
 
The Gift: Poems 1959-65 (1966)
The King Between (1967)
The Idealist (1968)
Where a Man Belongs (1969)
On the Road to Sydney (1970)
Hughie (1971)
Frank and Francesca (1972)
Gary (1972)
The Chinese Boy (1973)
The Cabby’s Daughter (1974)
Katie (1974)
Mister P and his Remarkable Flight (1975)
The Devilish Mystery of the Flying Mum (1977)
The Man in the Red Turban (1978)
I’ll Take Australia (1978)
The Mermaid Attack (1978)
I Rhyme My Time (1980)
Foreigners (1981)
Peppino (1983)
Armed Neutrality for Australia (1984)
The Girl Who Didn't Know Kelly (1985)
Fox On My Door (1987)
The Kitten Who Wouldn’t Purr (1987)
Clowning Sim (1988)
My strange Friend: An Autobiography (1991)
David Martin’s Beechworth book: poems (1993)

References

1915 births
1997 deaths
20th-century Australian journalists
20th-century Australian novelists
20th-century Australian poets
Australian male novelists
Australian male poets
Australian people of Hungarian-Jewish descent
Australian people of the Spanish Civil War
Communist Party of Australia members
Communist poets
Hungarian communists
Hungarian emigrants to Australia
Hungarian Jews
International Brigades personnel
Jewish Australian writers
Meanjin people
Members of the Order of Australia
Patrick White Award winners